

A~C

D

F–Z

See also
Audio codec
Audio compression (data)
Audio file format
Digital audio

Digital audio
Wikipedia glossaries
Wikipedia glossaries using description lists